Bushyhead is a census-designated place (CDP) in Rogers County, Oklahoma, United States. The population was 1,314 at the 2010 census, a 9.2 percent increase over the figure of 1,203 recorded in 2000. Established on the St. Louis-San Francisco Railway between Claremore and Vinita, the community was named for Dennis W. Bushyhead, Principal Chief of the Cherokee, 1879–1887. The post office existed from April 18, 1898, until November 15, 1955.

Geography
Bushyhead is located at  (36.452233, -95.516263).

Demographics

As of the census of 2000, there were 1,203 people, 431 households, and 344 families residing in the CDP. The population density was 80.3 people per square mile (31.0/km2). There were 474 housing units at an average density of 31.7/sq mi (12.2/km2). The racial makeup of the CDP was 74.56% White, 0.33% African American, 18.12% Native American, 0.83% from other races, and 6.15% from two or more races. Hispanic or Latino of any race were 2.00% of the population.

There were 431 households, out of which 37.4% had children under the age of 18 living with them, 68.0% were married couples living together, 6.7% had a female householder with no husband present, and 20.0% were non-families. 16.2% of all households were made up of individuals, and 4.4% had someone living alone who was 65 years of age or older. The average household size was 2.79 and the average family size was 3.09.

In the CDP, the population was spread out, with 30.7% under the age of 18, 7.1% from 18 to 24, 28.3% from 25 to 44, 25.3% from 45 to 64, and 8.6% who were 65 years of age or older. The median age was 35 years. For every 100 females, there were 104.2 males. For every 100 females age 18 and over, there were 101.0 males.

The median income for a household in the CDP was $33,438, and the median income for a family was $34,779. Males had a median income of $29,408 versus $22,009 for females. The per capita income for the CDP was $13,140. About 11.6% of families and 13.4% of the population were below the poverty line, including 16.3% of those under age 18 and 9.7% of those age 65 or over.

References

Further reading
Shirk, George H.; Oklahoma Place Names; University of Oklahoma Press; Norman, Oklahoma; 1987: .

External links
Dennis Wolfe Bushyhead, bio at Chronicles of Oklahoma, Oklahoma Historical Society

Census-designated places in Rogers County, Oklahoma
Census-designated places in Oklahoma